David Brian Drury (born 1 May 1961) is a former English cricketer. He was a left-handed batsman and wicket-keeper who played for Cumberland.

Drury made his debut for Cumberland in the Minor Counties Championship on 28 May 1985, playing as a specialist batsman at number seven.  Cumberland, who had former Test cricketer David Lloyd opening the batting, won the match by 116 runs, with Drury scoring 27 in the first-innings and 24* in the second.  He played in five further matches in the Minor Counties Championship, but failed to better his score of 27.  His only List A appearance came in the first round of the 1985 NatWest Trophy, when he scored four runs during a loss to Middlesex.

Drury now plays cricket for Ipswich Cricket Club in Suffolk.  His son Matthew is also a cricketer, playing for Suffolk 2nd XI and South of England Development teams.

References

External links
 
 

1961 births
Living people
Cumberland cricketers
English cricketers of 1969 to 2000
English cricketers
Wicket-keepers